The Bangladesh National Film Award for Best Screenplay is one of the highest film awards in Bangladesh. Since 1975, the awards are given in the category of best screenplay. The first award winner was Khan Ataur Rahman.

List of winners

References

Awards established in 1977
Bangladeshi film awards